Scyllarides aequinoctialis is a species of slipper lobster that lives in the western Atlantic Ocean from South Carolina to São Paulo State, Brazil, including the Gulf of Mexico, Caribbean Sea and Bermuda. Its common name is Spanish slipper lobster. S. aequinoctialis is the type species of the genus Scyllarides, and the first species of slipper lobster to be described from the Western Atlantic.

References

External links
 

Achelata
Crustaceans described in 1793
Crustaceans of the Atlantic Ocean
Arthropods of the Dominican Republic